USS Riverside may refer to the following ships of the United States Navy:

 , a wooden, schooner-rigged barge, was built during 1890 at Brooklyn, New York.
 , a Bayfield-class attack transport which saw service during World War II

United States Navy ship names